Dobrocinek may refer to the following places in Poland:
Dobrocinek, Lower Silesian Voivodeship (south-west Poland)
Dobrocinek, Warmian-Masurian Voivodeship (north Poland)